Thrissur KSRTC bus station is a state-owned Kerala State Road Transport Corporation (KSRTC) bus station in Kokkalai in the heart of the Thrissur City, India. The bus station is very near to the Thrissur railway station.

Overview
The bus station runs long distance, inter-state and city services. It is a particularly important station because of its strategic location on the major NH 66 and NH 544. It is also the centre most station is the state thus having easiest access in the state to all the major cities in Kerala and South India. There is an online reservation counter at Thrissur bus station.

Modernisation plans
Kerala Government is rebuilding the bus station at a cost of Rs 50 crore. This modern bus station will be built on BoT basis. The new bus station can accommodate around three thousand buses in one day. Around 100 buses can also be parked in the bus station according to the new plans.

References

Transport in Thrissur
Bus stations in Kerala
Buildings and structures in Thrissur